Antonio Conelli (26 September 1909 – 14 August 2003) was an Italian freestyle swimmer who competed in the 1928 Summer Olympics.

In 1928 he was eliminated in the semi-finals of the 100 metre freestyle event. He was also a member of the Italian relay team which was eliminated in the first round of the 4×200 metre freestyle relay competition.

External links

External links
 

1909 births
2003 deaths
Italian male swimmers
Olympic swimmers of Italy
Swimmers at the 1928 Summer Olympics
European Aquatics Championships medalists in swimming
Italian male freestyle swimmers